Vietnam–Sweden Hospital is the largest general hospital in Uông Bì, Quảng Ninh Province, Vietnam, founded in 1981 with the help of the Swedish.

At present, the hospital has 7 functional, 19 clinical and 8 subclinical departments. Vietnam–Sweden Hospital has 580 beds, employs 619 health workers including 140 medical doctors and pharmacists.

Each year Vietnam–Sweden hospital organize services for nearly 140,000 out-patients, 33,000 in-patients and performs about  9,500  major surgical operations.

See also
List of hospitals in Vietnam

External links
 Official page of Vietnam–Sweden Hospital

Hospital buildings completed in 1981
Buildings and structures in Quảng Ninh province
Hospitals in Vietnam